The Biessenhofen–Füssen railway is a single-track and non-electrified branch line in the German state of Bavaria and it is a branch line connecting Füssen with the village of Biessenhofen on the Buchloe–Lindau railway. The Biessenhofen–Marktoberdorf section was opened in 1876 by the Royal Bavarian State Railways. On 1 June 1889, the extension to Füssen was opened, but it was built and operated by the private Lokalbahn AG (LAG). After its bankruptcy, the Marktoberdorf–Füssen section was nationalised on 1 August 1938. Until the end of 2018, the track was operated by Deutsche Bahn and also known by the name König-Ludwig-Bahn ("King Ludwig Railway"). Since then, it has been operated by the private operator Bayerische Regiobahn.

Transport

The line is served hourly by Regionalbahn services on the Augsburg– route (RB77). The Munich–Füssen route (RB 68) is also served by three train pairs a day. These are operated by Bayerische Regiobahn with Alstom Coradia LINT diesel multiple units. 

There is a bus connection from Füssen station to Neuschwanstein chateau.

Notes

External links

Kursbuchtabelle aus dem Jahr 1944 (damalige KBS 404r)
Geschichte des Füssener Bahnhofs auf www.füssen.de
 

Branch lines in Bavaria
Railway lines opened in 1876
1876 establishments in Germany